Anophthalmus is a genus of ground beetle endemic to Europe. It contains the following species:

 Anophthalmus aidovskanus Ganglbauer, 1913
 Anophthalmus alphonsi J. Muller, 1914
 Anophthalmus amplus Joseph, 1871
 Anophthalmus baratellii Sciaky, 1985
 Anophthalmus bernhaueri Ganglbauer, 1895
 Anophthalmus besnicensis Pretner, 1949
 Anophthalmus bohiniensis Ganglbauer, 1903
 Anophthalmus bojani Daffner, 1998
 Anophthalmus bucoveci Pretner, 1949
 Anophthalmus capillatus Joseph, 1871
 Anophthalmus daffnerii Broder, 1994
 Anophthalmus driolii Bognolo & M. Etonti, 1996
 Anophthalmus egonis J. Muller, 1923
 Anophthalmus erebus Krauss, 1906
 Anophthalmus fabbrii J. Muller, 1931
 Anophthalmus fallaciosus J. Muller, 1914
 Anophthalmus gobanzi Ganglbauer, 1911
 Anophthalmus gridellii J. Muller, 1931
 Anophthalmus haraldianus Daffner, 1992
 Anophthalmus hauckei P. Maravec & Lompe
 Anophthalmus heteromorphus J. Muller, 1923
 Anophthalmus hirtus Sturm, 1853
 Anophthalmus hitleri Scheibel, 1937
 Anophthalmus jalzici Daffner, 1996
 Anophthalmus kahleni Daffner, 1998
 Anophthalmus kaufmanni Ganglbauer, 1900
 Anophthalmus kerteszi Csiki, 1912
 Anophthalmus kofleri Daffner, 1996
 Anophthalmus leander Sciaky, Monguzzi & Trezzi, 1999
 Anophthalmus maderi Winkler, 1914
 Anophthalmus manhartensis Meschnigg, 1943
 Anophthalmus mayeri J. Muller, 1909
 Anophthalmus meggiolaroi P. Moravec & Lompe
 Anophthalmus micklitzi Ganglbauer, 1913
 Anophthalmus nivalis J. Muller, 1922
 Anophthalmus paciuchensis Monguzzi, 1995
 Anophthalmus pretneri J. Muller, 1913
 Anophthalmus ravasinii J. Muller, 1922
 Anophthalmus sanctaeluciae J. Muller, 1931
 Anophthalmus schatzmayri P. Moravec & Lompe
 Anophthalmus schaumii Schaum, 1860
 Anophthalmus schmidti Sturm, 1844
 Anophthalmus scopolii F.J. Schmidt, 1850
 Anophthalmus seppenhoferi Bognolo, 1997
 Anophthalmus severi Ganglbauer, 1897
 Anophthalmus spectabilis Joseph, 1871
 Anophthalmus temporalis J. Muller, 1913
 Anophthalmus tolminensis J. Muller, 1922
 Anophthalmus winklerianus Jeannel, 1926

References

External links
Anophthalmus at Fauna Europaea

Trechinae
Carabidae genera